Cambrin is a commune in the Pas-de-Calais department in the Hauts-de-France region of France.

Geography
The marshes of Cambrin are an area of ponds and swamps bordering the communes of Cuinchy and Annequin. They cover 22 hectares and are open to the public. This natural space is managed by the Nature Conservatory Sites of Nord and Pas-de-Calais.  
As fenland, it plays a major ecological function for the water for the town and surrounding area and contributes to reducing the pollution of surface water.
The marshes, which had formerly been used to pump cooling water to the power station of Violaines, consists of a vast wooded wetland. The place is so attractive that a discovery trail has been created for visitors to enjoy their natural heritage.  Many species of birds may be observed along this path.

Population

Places of interest
 The church of Notre-Dame, rebuilt along with the rest of the village, after the First World War.
 The Commonwealth War Graves Commission cemeteries.
 The war memorial, one of seven replicas (in France) of Bartholdi's Statue of Liberty.

See also
Communes of the Pas-de-Calais department

References

External links

 Official website of the village 
 The CWGC extension to the communal cemetery
 The CWGC military cemetery

Communes of Pas-de-Calais